The China–United States trade war is an ongoing economic conflict between China and the United States. In January 2018, U.S. President Donald Trump began setting tariffs and other trade barriers on China with the goal of forcing it to make changes to what the U.S. says are longstanding unfair trade practices and intellectual property theft. The Trump administration stated that these practices may contribute to the U.S.–China trade deficit, and that the Chinese government requires transfer of American technology to China. In response to US trade measures, the Chinese government accused the Trump administration of engaging in nationalist protectionism and took retaliatory action. After the trade war escalated through 2019, in January 2020 the two sides reached a tense phase one agreement; it expired in December 2021 with China failing by a wide margin to reach its targets for U.S. imports to China. By the end of the Trump presidency, the trade war was widely characterized as a failure. His successor, Joe Biden, has kept tariffs in place.

Background

Trade relationship
Since the 1980s, Trump had advocated tariffs to eliminate the U.S. trade deficit and  promote domestic manufacturing, saying the country was being "ripped off" by its trading partners; imposing tariffs became a major plank of his presidential campaign. Most economists do not believe trade deficits pose a significant problem for the American economy. Nearly all economists who responded to surveys  conducted by the Associated Press and Reuters said  Trump's tariffs would do more harm than good to the American economy, and some economists advocated alternate means to address trade deficits with China.

The volume of trade in goods between the US and China has grown rapidly since the beginning of China's economic reforms in the late 1970s. The growth of trade accelerated after China's entry into the World Trade Organization (WTO) in 2001, with the US and China becoming one another's most important trading partners. The US has consistently imported more from China than it has exported to China, with the bilateral US trade deficit in goods with China rising to $375.6 billion in 2017.

The US government has at times criticized various aspects of the US-China trade relationship, including large bilateral trade deficits, and China's relatively inflexible exchange rates. The administrations of George W. Bush and Barack Obama imposed quotas and tariffs on Chinese textiles in order to shield US domestic producers, accusing China of exporting these products at dumping prices. During the Obama administration, the US additionally accused China of subsidizing aluminium and steel production, and initiated a range of anti-dumping investigations against China. During these two US administrations, US-Chinese trade continued to grow. During this time, China's economy grew to be the second largest in the world (using nominal exchange rates), second only to that of the US. Large-scale Chinese economic initiatives, such as the Belt and Road Initiative, the Asian Infrastructure Investment Bank and "Made in China 2025" alarmed some US policymakers. More broadly, China's economic growth has been viewed by the US government as a challenge to American economic and geopolitical dominance.

During his 2016 presidential campaign, Donald Trump promised to reduce the US trade deficit with China, which he attributed to unfair trade practices, such as intellectual property theft and lack of access by US companies to the Chinese market. American proponents of tariffs on China have argued that tariffs will bring manufacturing jobs to the US; that bilateral tariffs should be reciprocal; that the US should eliminate its trade deficit with China; and that China should change various policies governing intellectual property and investment. Most economists are skeptical of the ability of tariffs to achieve the first three of these goals.  A study estimates that U.S. exports to China provide support to 1.2 million American jobs and that Chinese multinational companies directly employ 197,000 Americans, while U.S. companies invested $105 billion in China in 2019. Economists have studied the impact of trade with China and increasing labor productivity on employment in the American manufacturing sector, with mixed results. Most economists believe that the American trade deficit is the result of macroeconomic factors, rather than trade policy. While increased tariffs on Chinese goods are expected to decrease US imports from China, they are expected to lead to increased imports from other countries, leaving the United States' overall trade deficit largely unchanged - a phenomenon known as trade diversion.

Trump administration's complaints 

Donald Trump's first noted advocacy for tariffs was prompted by Japanese economic success in the 1980s, arguing that the U.S. trade deficit was a burden and that tariffs would promote domestic manufacturing that would keep the United States from being "ripped off" by its trading partners. Imposing tariffs was subsequently a major plank of his successful 2016 presidential campaign. In early 2011, he stated that because China has manipulated their currency, "it is almost impossible for our companies to compete with Chinese companies."

In the 2016 US presidential election, Trump ran on a protectionist economic platform. As president, in August 2017, he directed the Office of the United States Trade Representative (USTR) to investigate Chinese economic practices. The resulting report, issued in March 2018, attacked many aspects of Chinese economic policy, focusing particularly on alleged technology transfer, which the report stated cost the US economy $225 billion and $600 billion annually. Following the issuing of the report, Trump ordered the imposition of tariffs on Chinese products, the filing of a WTO case against China and restrictions on Chinese investment in high-tech sectors of the US economy.

In supporting tariffs as president, he said that China was costing the American economy hundreds of billions of dollars a year because of unfair trade practices. After imposing tariffs, he denied entering into a trade war, saying the "trade war was lost many years ago by the foolish, or incompetent, people who represented the U.S." He said that the U.S. has a trade deficit of $500 billion a year, with intellectual property (IP) theft costing an additional $300 billion. "We cannot let this continue," he said. Former White House Counsel, Jim Schultz, said that "through multiple presidential administrations — Clinton, Bush and Obama — the United States has naively looked the other way while China cheated its way to an unfair advantage in the international trade market."

According to the administration, the Chinese government's reforms have been minimal and have not been fair and reciprocal: "After years of U.S.-China dialogues that produced minimal results and commitments that China did not honor, the United States is taking action to confront China over its state-led, market-distorting forced technology transfers, intellectual property practices, and cyber intrusions of U.S. commercial networks."

Technology is considered the most important part of the U.S. economy. According to U.S. Trade Representative Robert E. Lighthizer, China maintains a policy of "forced technology transfer," along with practicing "state capitalism," including buying U.S. technology companies and using cybertheft to gain technology. As a result, officials in the Trump administration were, by early 2018, taking steps to prevent Chinese state-controlled companies from buying American technology companies and were trying to stop American companies from handing over their key technologies to China as a cost of entering their market. According to political analyst Josh Rogin: "There was a belief that China would develop a private economy that would prove compatible with the WTO system. Chinese leadership has made a political decision to do the opposite. So now we have to respond."

Lighthizer said that the value of the tariffs imposed was based on U.S. estimates of the actual economic damage caused by alleged theft of intellectual property and foreign-ownership restrictions that require foreign companies to transfer technology. Such forced Joint ventures give Chinese companies illicit access to American technology.{{#tag:ref|<ref>

Over half of the members of the American Chamber of Commerce in the People's Republic of China thought that leakage of intellectual property was an important concern when doing business there.

In August 2017, Robert Lighthizer investigated China's alleged unfair trade practices.

Initiating steel and aluminium tariff actions in March 2018, Trump said "trade wars are good, and easy to win," but as the conflict continued to escalate through August 2019, Trump stated, "I never said China was going to be easy."

Peter Navarro, White House Office of Trade and Manufacturing Policy Director, explained that the tariffs are "purely defensive measures" to reduce the trade deficit. He says that the cumulative trillions of dollars that Americans transfer overseas as a result of yearly deficits are then used by those countries to buy America's assets, as opposed to investing that money in the U.S. "If we do as we're doing . . . those trillions of dollars are in the hands of foreigners that they can then use to buy up America."

China's response and counter-allegations
The Chinese government argues that the US government's real goal is to stifle China's growth, and that the trade war has had a negative effect on the world. The Chinese government has blamed the American government for starting the conflict and said that US actions were making negotiations difficult. Zhang Xiangchen, China's ambassador to the World Trade Organization, said the U.S. Trade Representative was operating with a "presumption of guilt", making claims without evidence and based on speculation.

The Chinese government has denied forced transfer of IP is a mandatory practice, and acknowledged the impact of domestic R&D performed in China. Former U.S. treasury secretary Larry Summers assessed that Chinese leadership in some technological fields was the result of "huge government investment in basic science" and not "theft" of U.S. properties. In March 2019, the National People's Congress endorsed a new foreign investment bill, to take effect in 2020, which explicitly prohibits the forced transfer of IP from foreign companies, and grants stronger protection to foreign intellectual property and trade secrets. China had also planned to lift restrictions on foreign investment in the automotive industry in 2022. AmCham China policy committee chair Lester Ross criticized the bill, saying the text of the bill was "rushed" and "broad", and also criticized a portion of the bill that granted the country power to retaliate against countries that impose restrictions on Chinese companies.

On 20 January 2021, China imposed sanctions against outgoing US Secretary of State Mike Pompeo, former secretary of health and human services Alex Azar, former under secretary of state Keith J. Krach, outgoing US ambassador to the United Nations Kelly Craft, and 24 other former Trump officials. Biden's National Security Council called the sanctions "unproductive and cynical."

Biden administration restrictions 
The Biden administration had not withdrawn Trump-era tariffs on Chinese imports, as of September 2022. In fact, the Democratic administration has introduced a number of new export limits and US investment bans for Chinese companies to protect US economic and military interests. In October 2022, the US Department of Commerce expanded sanctions after implicating 50 Chinese companies, including telecoms equipment maker Huawei in June 2021. Export controls were also introduced for chip maker Nvidia, Yangtze Memory Technologies (YMTC) and ChangXin Memory Technologies. Sanctions were expanded to include Chinese companies such as drone maker DJI and genomics company BGI Genomics, among others. South Korean telecom companies trading with the PRC were partially excluded from the new restrictions.

Chronology

2018
 January 22: Trump announced tariffs on solar panels and washing machines. About 8% of American solar panel imports in 2017 came from China. Imports of residential washing machines from China totaled about $1.1 billion in 2015.
 March 1: Trump announced steel and aluminium tariffs on imports from all countries. The United States had imported about 3% of its steel from China. The announcement drew criticism from the editorial board of The Wall Street Journal, which called the executive order "the biggest policy blunder of his Presidency."
March 22: Trump asked the United States trade representative (USTR) to investigate applying tariffs on US$50–60 billion worth of Chinese goods. He relied on Section 301 of the Trade Act of 1974 for doing so, stating that the proposed tariffs were "a response to the unfair trade practices of China over the years", including theft of U.S. intellectual property. Over 1,300 categories of Chinese imports were listed for tariffs, including aircraft parts, batteries, flat-panel televisions, medical devices, satellites, and various weapons.
April 2: Ministry of Commerce of China responded by imposing tariffs on 128 products it imports from America, including aluminium, airplanes, cars, pork, and soybeans (which have a 25% tariff), as well as fruit, nuts, and steel piping (15%). U.S. commerce secretary Wilbur Ross said that the planned Chinese tariffs only reflected 0.3% of U.S. gross domestic product, and Press Secretary Sarah Huckabee Sanders stated that the moves would have "short-term pain" but bring "long-term success".
 April 3: The U.S. Trade Representative's office published an initial list of 1,300+ Chinese goods to impose levies upon, including products like flat-screen televisions, weapons, satellites, medical devices, aircraft parts and batteries. Chinese Ambassador Cui Tiankai responded by warning the U.S. that they may fight back, saying "We have done the utmost to avoid this kind of situation, but if the other side makes the wrong choice, then we have no alternative but to fight back."
 April 4: China's Customs Tariff Commission of the State Council decided to announce a plan of additional tariffs of 25% on 106 items of products including automobiles, airplanes, and soybeans. Soybeans are the top U.S. agricultural export to China.
 April 5: Trump said that he was considering another round of tariffs on an additional $100 billion of Chinese imports as Beijing retaliates. The next day the World Trade Organization received request from China for consultations on new U.S. tariffs.

May 9: China cancelled soybean orders exported from United States to China. Zhang Xiaoping, Chinese director for the U.S. Soybean Export Council, said Chinese buyers simply stopped buying from the U.S.
May 15: Vice Premier and Politburo member Liu He, top economic adviser to president of China and General Secretary Xi Jinping, visited Washington for further trade talks.
May 20: Chinese officials agreed to "substantially reduce" America's trade deficit with China by committing to "significantly increase" its purchases of American goods. As a result, Treasury Secretary Steven Mnuchin announced that "We are putting the trade war on hold". White House National Trade Council director Peter Navarro said there was no "trade war", rather a "trade dispute, fair and simple. We lost the trade war long ago."
 May 21: Trump tweeted that "China has agreed to buy massive amounts of ADDITIONAL Farm/Agricultural Products," although he later clarified the purchases were contingent upon the closure of a "potential deal."
May 29: The White House announced that it would impose a 25% tariff on $50 billion of Chinese goods with "industrially significant technology;" the full list of products affected to be announced by June 15. It also planned to impose investment restrictions and enhanced export controls on certain Chinese individuals and organizations to prevent them from acquiring U.S. technology. China said it would discontinue trade talks with Washington if it imposed trade sanctions."
June 15: Trump declared that the United States would impose a 25% tariff on $50 billion of Chinese exports. $34 billion would start July 6, 2018, with a further $16 billion to begin at a later date. China's Commerce Ministry accused the United States of launching a trade war and said China would respond in kind with similar tariffs for US imports, starting on July 6. Three days later, the White House declared that the United States would impose additional 10% tariffs on another $200 billion worth of Chinese imports if China retaliated against these U.S. tariffs. The list of products included in this round of tariffs was released on July 11, 2018, and was set to be implemented within 60 days.
June 19: China retaliates, threatening its own tariffs on $50 billion of U.S. goods, and stating that the United States had launched a trade war. Import and export markets in a number of nations feared the tariffs would disrupt supply chains which could "ripple around the globe."
July 6: American tariffs on $34 billion of Chinese goods came into effect. China imposed retaliatory tariffs on US goods of a similar value. The tariffs accounted for 0.1% of the global gross domestic product. On July 10, 2018, U.S. released an initial list of the additional $200 billion of Chinese goods that would be subject to a 10% tariff. Two days later, China vowed to retaliate with additional tariffs on American goods worth $60 billion annually.
August 8: The Office of the United States Trade Representative published its finalized list of 279 Chinese goods, worth $16 billion, to be subject to a 25% tariff from August 23. In response, China imposed 25% tariffs on $16 billion of imports from the US, which was implemented in parallel with the US tariffs on August 23.
August 14: China filed a complaint with the World Trade Organization (WTO), stating that US tariffs on foreign solar panels clash with WTO ruling and have destabilized the international market for solar PV products. China stated that the resulting impact directly harmed China's legitimate trade interests. Peng Peng, a researcher with the China Renewable Energy Industry Association said that the solar problem has existed for years and thought that China chose to bring it up in order to keep up the rhythm of the trade dispute.
August 22: US treasury undersecretary David Malpass and Chinese commerce vice-minister Wang Shouwen met in Washington, D.C. in a bid to reopen negotiations. Meanwhile, on August 23, 2018, the US and China's promised tariffs on $16 billion of goods took effect, and on August 27, 2018, China filed a new WTO complaint against the US regarding the additional tariffs.
September 17: The US announced its 10% tariff on $200 billion worth of Chinese goods would begin on September 24, 2018, increasing to 25% by the end of the year. They also threatened tariffs on an additional $267 billion worth of imports if China retaliates, which China promptly did on September 18 with 10% tariffs on $60 billion of US imports. So far, China has either imposed or proposed tariffs on $110 billion of U.S. goods, representing most of its imports of American products.
November 10: White House National Trade Council director Peter Navarro alleged that a group of Wall Street billionaires are conducting an influence operation on behalf of the Chinese government by weakening the president and the U.S. negotiating position, and urged them to invest in the rust belt.
November 30: President Trump signed the revised U.S.–Mexico–Canada Agreement in Buenos Aires, Argentina. The USMCA contains a "rules of origin" provision for automobile that was "touted by the Trump administration as a tool to keep out Chinese inputs and encourage production and investment in the US and North America."
December 1: The planned increases in tariffs were postponed. The White House stated that both parties will "immediately begin negotiations on structural changes with respect to forced technology transfer, intellectual property protection, non-tariff barriers, cyber intrusions and cyber theft." According to the Trump Administration, "If at the end of [90 days], the parties are unable to reach an agreement, the 10 percent tariffs will be raised to 25 percent." The U.S. trade representative's office confirmed the hard deadline for China's structural changes is March 1, 2019. 
December 4: New York Fed president John Williams said that he believed the US economy will stay strong in 2019. Williams expects that increases in the interest rates will be necessary to maintain the economy. He stated, "Given this outlook of strong growth, strong labor market and inflation near our goal and taking account all the various risks around the outlook, I do expect further gradual increases in interest rates will best sponsor a sustained economic expansion."
 December 11: Trump announced China was buying a "tremendous amount" of U.S. soybeans. Commodities traders saw no evidence of such purchases, and over the next six months soybean exports to China were about one quarter what they were in 2017, before the trade conflict began. China reportedly considered purchases of American farm goods as contingent upon closing a comprehensive trade deal.

2019
January 14: An article in The Wall Street Journal reports that in China's 2018 trade surplus with the United States was a record $323.32 billion despite Trump's tariffs. 
March 6: The U.S. Department of Commerce stated that in 2018 the U.S. trade deficit with China reached $621 billion, the highest it had been since 2008. 
May 5: Trump stated that the previous tariffs of 10% levied in $200 billion worth of Chinese goods would be raised to 25% on May 10. With notification by USTR, the Federal Register on May 9 published the modification of duty on or after 12:01 a.m. Eastern Time Zone May 10 to 25% for the products of China covered by the September 2018 action. The stated reason being that China reneged upon already agreed upon deals.
May 9: Trump said the tariffs are "paid for mostly by China, by the way, not by us." Economic analysts concluded this was an incorrect assertion as American businesses and consumers ultimately pay the tariffs as real-world examples of tariffs working as intended are rare, and consumers of the tariff-levying country are the primary victims of tariffs, by having to pay higher prices. "It is inaccurate to say that countries pay tariffs on commercial and consumer goods—it is the buyers and sellers that bear the costs," said Ross Burkhart, a Boise State University political scientist. "Purchasers pay the tariff when they buy popular products. Sellers lose market share when their products get priced out of markets," Burkhart added.
May 15: Trump signed executive order 13873, placing Huawei on the Department of Commerce's Entity List. According to Reuters, the move banned Huawei from buying vital parts and components from U.S. companies without special approval and effectively barred its equipment from U.S. telecom networks on national security grounds. 
June 1: China will raise tariffs on $60 billion worth of US goods.
June 29: During the G20 Osaka summit, Trump announces he and Xi Jinping agreed to a "truce" in the trade war after extensive talks. Prior tariffs are to remain in effect, but no future tariffs are to be enacted "for the time being" amid restarted negotiations. Additionally, Trump said he would allow American companies to sell their products to Huawei, but the company would remain on the U.S. Entity List. The extent to which this plan to temporarily exempt Huawei from previous bans would be implemented later became unclear and, in the weeks later, there was no clear indication of the reversal of Huawei bans.
 June 29: After a meeting with Chinese leader Xi Jinping, Trump announces "China is going to be buying a tremendous amount of food and agricultural product, and they're going to start that very soon, almost immediately." China disputed making such a commitment and one month later no such purchases had materialized.
July 11: Trump tweeted "China is letting us down in that they have not been buying the agricultural products from our great Farmers that they said they would." People familiar with the trade negotiations said China had made no firm commitments to purchase farm goods unless it was part of a comprehensive trade agreement.
July 15: Official figures from China showed its second-quarter GDP growth at its slowest in 27 years.
July 17: China announced an accelerated decrease in holdings of US treasury holdings, targeting 25% of its current holdings of $1.1 trillion.
August 1: Trump announced on Twitter that additional 10% tariff will be levied on the "remaining $300 billion of goods".
August 5: The central bank of China (PBOC) let the Renminbi fall over 2% in three days to the lowest point since 2008 as it was hit by strong sales due to the threat of tariffs.
August 5: The U.S. Department of Treasury officially declared China as a Currency Manipulator after the People's Bank of China allowed its yuan to depreciate that, according to CNN, was seen as retaliation to Trump's August 1 tariff announcement. According to an article in The Washington Post, Trump reportedly pressured the Treasury Department Steven Mnuchin to authorize the designation. Both the IMF and the Chinese government have rejected the designation, with the IMF saying that the valuation of the yuan are in line with China's economic fundamentals. 
August 5: China ordered state-owned enterprises to stop buying US agricultural products  in retaliation to Trump's August 1 tariff announcement. Zippy Duvall, president of the American Farm Bureau Federation, called the move "a body blow to thousands of farmers and ranchers who are already struggling to get by," adding, "Farm Bureau economists tell us exports to China were down by $1.3 billion during the first half of the year. Now, we stand to lose all of what was a $9.1 billion market in 2018, which was down sharply from the $19.5 billion U.S. farmers exported to China in 2017."
August 13: Official figures from China showed its industrial output growth falling amid the trade war to a 17-year low.
August 13: Trump delayed some of the tariffs. $112 billion worth will still take place on September 1 (which means that on September 1, $362 billion total worth, including the newly imposed $112 billion, of Chinese products will face a tariff), but the additional, not yet imposed, $160 billion will not take effect until December 15. Trump and his advisors Peter Navarro, Wilbur Ross and Larry Kudlow said that the tariffs were postponed to avoid harming American consumers during the Christmas shopping season. 
August 23: Chinese Ministry of Finance announced new rounds of retaliative tariffs on $75 billion worth of U.S. goods, effective beginning September 1. 
August 23: Trump tweeted that he "hereby ordered" American companies to "immediately start looking for an alternative to China". According to an article in The New York Times, Trump's aides said that no order had been drawn up nor was it clear one would be. In a tweet on the following day, Trump said that he had the authority to make good on his threat, citing the International Emergency Economic Powers Act of 1977. Furthermore, tariffs  are to be raised from 25% to 30% on the existing $250 billion worth of Chinese goods beginning on October 1, 2019, and from 10% to 15% on the remaining $300 billion worth of  goods beginning on December 15, 2019.
 August 26: At the G7 summit, Trump stated, "China called last night our top trade people and said 'let's get back to the table' so we will be getting back to the table and I think they want to do something. They have been hurt very badly but they understand this is the right thing to do and I have great respect for it." Chinese Foreign Ministry spokesman Geng Shuang said he was unaware of such a call and Trump aides later said the call didn't occur but the president was trying to project optimism.
August 28: Americans for Free Trade, an umbrella group for 161 trade associations across numerous industries, sent Trump a letter asking him to postpone all scheduled tariff increases. The next day, Trump said "badly run and weak companies are smartly blaming these small Tariffs instead of themselves for bad management."
September 1: New USA and Chinese tariffs previously announced went into effect at 12:01 pm EST. China imposed 5% to 10% tariffs on one-third of the 5,078 goods it imports from America, with tariffs on the remainder scheduled for December 15. The United States imposed new 15% tariffs on about $112 billion of Chinese imports, such that more than two-thirds of consumer goods imported from China were then subject to tariffs.
 September 4: The Office of the U.S. Trade Representative and Chinese state media confirmed that deputy-level meetings in mid-September would lead to ministerial-level talks in coming weeks. At the same time, the United States Department of Commerce issued preliminary antidumping duty determinations on fabricated structural steel from Canada, China, and Mexico. Furthermore, China was found liable for dumping up to 141.38% of fabricated structural steel into the United States and thereby prompted the U.S. Customs and Border Protection to collect cash deposits in the same rate, as instructed by the Commerce Department.
September 6: The People's Bank of China announces a 0.5 percent reduction in its reserve requirement ratio in response to the slowing of China's economic growth rates caused by the trade war.
 September 11: After China announced it was exempting 16 American product types from tariffs for one year, Trump announced he would delay until October 15 a tariff increase on Chinese goods previously scheduled for October 1. Trump asserted he granted the delay at the request of Chinese vice premier Liu He.
 September 12: Bloomberg News and Politico reported that Trump advisors were increasingly concerned that the trade war was weakening the American economy going into the 2020 election campaign and were discussing ways to reach a limited interim deal. The Wall Street Journal reported China was seeking to narrow the scope of negotiations to place national security matters on a separate track from trade issues.
 September 26: The Wall Street Journal reported that Chinese retaliatory tariffs on lumber and wood products had caused hardwood lumber exports to China to fall 40% during 2019, resulting in American lumber mills slashing employment. A USDA spokesperson said the organization had provided the industry $5 million in aid through its Agricultural Trade Promotion Program.
October 7: Citing human rights issues, the United States Department of Commerce puts 20 Chinese public security bureaus and eight high tech companies, such as HikVision, SenseTime and Megvii, on the Export Administration Regulations Entity List. Like Huawei, which was sanctioned on an identical blueprint for national security reasons, the entities will need U.S. government approval before they can purchase components from U.S. companies.
 October 11: Trump announced that the United States and China had reached a tentative agreement for the "first phase" of a trade deal, with China agreeing to buy up to $50 billion in American farm products, and to accept more American financial services in their market, with the United States agreeing to suspend new tariffs scheduled for October 15. The deal was expected to be finalized in coming weeks. At the same time, Chinese announcements did not express the same confidence, though a few days later the Chinese Foreign Ministry said that the two sides had the same understanding and had reached an agreement.
October 17: Official figures from China showed its third quarter GDP growth at its slowest in almost 30 years.
December 13: Both countries announce an initial deal where new tariffs to be mutually imposed on December 15 would not be implemented. China says it "will increase purchases of high-quality agricultural products from the U.S.", while the United States says it will halve the existing 15% tariffs.
December 31: The Wall Street Journal reported that the language of the phase one deal was expected to be released after the January 15 signing, and that Lighthizer said some details would be classified.

2020

January 3: Reuters reported that in December 2019 the American manufacturing sector fell into its deepest slump in over a decade, attributing the decline to the U.S.-China trade war.
January 15: U.S. President Donald Trump and  China's Vice Premier Liu He signed the US–China Phase One trade deal in Washington DC. The "Economic and Trade Agreement between the United States of America and the People's Republic of China" is set to take effect from February 14, 2020, and focuses on intellectual property rights (Chapter 1), technology transfer (Chapter 2), food and agricultural products (Chapter 3), financial services (Chapter 4), exchange rate matters and transparency (Chapter 5), and expanding trade (Chapter 6), with reference also being made to  bilateral evaluation and dispute resolution procedures in Chapter 7. The agreement allows for a party to request additional consultation in the event of a "natural disaster or other unforeseeable event." Unlike other trade agreements, the US–China Phase One agreement did not rely on arbitration through an intergovernmental organization like the World Trade Organization, but rather through a bilateral mechanism.
January 17: Official figures from China showed its 2019 economic growth rate falling amid the trade war to a 30-year low. 
February 5: Data from the Commerce Department of the United States showed the country's trade deficit falling amid the trade war for the first time in 6 years.
February 17: China grants tariff exemptions on 696 US goods to support purchases.
March 5: The United States Trade Representative granted exemptions to tariffs on various types of medical equipment, after calls from American lawmakers and others to remove tariffs on these products in light of the COVID-19 pandemic in the United States.
May 12: The Chinese government announced exemptions for tariffs on 79 additional US goods.
May 14: The Chinese government announced that it would permit imports of barley and blueberries from the United States.
As of June, China had risen to become the United States' top trading partner again, amid the global crisis caused by the COVID-19 pandemic. However, the countries were on track to miss the targets from the trade deal, hitting which would have been hard even under strong economic conditions, according to Chad Brown of the Peterson Institute for International Economics and Chenjun Pan of Rabobank. The economic damage and barriers to trade caused by the pandemic made those targets even harder to reach.
September 15: A three-person WTO panel found that the Trump administration tariffs violated global trade rules because they had been applied only to China and they exceeded the maximum rates the US had agreed to, without adequate explanation. Lighthizer responded that the finding showed "the WTO is completely inadequate to stop China's harmful technology practices."
September 26: The US Commerce Department imposed restrictions on China's largest chip maker, Semiconductor Manufacturing International Corporation (SMIC), determining that an "unacceptable risk" equipment supplied to SMIC could potentially be used for military purposes. Under the restrictions, the suppliers were barred from exporting the chip without a license.
November 8: President Donald Trump signed an executive order prohibiting Americans from investing in shares of companies with ties to the Chinese military. New transactions would be barred from 11 January 2021, while investors that already held such stocks would have until November 2021 to divest them. On 6 January 2021, the New York Stock Exchange announced that it would delist stocks related to China Mobile, China Telecom and China Unicom. Index provider MSCI also announced it would stop including China Mobile, China Telecom and China Unicom in its benchmarks.
 By the end of 2020, China and the U.S. had achieved only 58% of targets for U.S. exports to China under the phase one trade agreement. This was seen as a sign that the original targets were unrealistic. The U.S.-based Peterson Institute for International Economics said China had "failed spectacularly" to meet its import targets and "much of the deal was a failure."

2021

 January 13: The Trump administration banned cotton and tomato products originating in Xinjiang, including products manufactured outside of China but using cotton and tomatoes from Xinjiang, over forced labor allegations.
 January 20: Trump left office and Joe Biden was inaugurated as president of the United States. Biden said that he did not have immediate plans to remove the tariffs and planned to review the phase one trade deal and discuss the matter with allies first.
 January 20: China imposed sanctions against outgoing US Secretary of State Mike Pompeo, former secretary of health and human services Alex Azar, former under secretary of state Keith J. Krach, outgoing US ambassador to the United Nations Kelly Craft, and 24 other former Trump officials. Biden's National Security Council called the sanctions "unproductive and cynical."
 February 22: China's Foreign Minister Wang Yi called for US President Joe Biden to lift the multiple restrictions imposed by Trump. During a Foreign Ministry forum on US-China relations, he urged the Biden administration to lift the sanctions on trade and people-to-people contact, while asking it to stop interfering in China's internal affairs.
 March 18–19: High level talks took place in Anchorage, Alaska to discuss key geopolitical disagreements.
 In May and June 2021, discussions continued between high-level officials, including Liu He and Wang Wentao from China and Katherine Tai, Janet Yellen, and Gina Raimondo from the United States. The Chinese Ministry of Commerce described the talks as candid, productive, and pragmatic, while Tai and Yellen said they looked forward to further dialogue.

2022 

 September 6: the Biden administration barred US tech companies that receive federal funding from building "advanced technology" facilities in China for the next ten years. This decision came after several American business groups have asked for more governmental action to reduce the United States' reliance on China and after a microchip shortage that slowed down production.
 December 9: The WTO ruled that former US President Donald Trump was in breach of global trade rules in 2018 with his administration's tariffs on steel and aluminium. The Biden administration however disputed the panel's rulings and instead stated that they will not take away the duties that Trump had earlier established. Brussels had criticised the US for having rejected the WTO ruling. Bernd Lange, chairperson of the European Parliament's international trade committee, stated, "The USA's reaction of simply rejecting the ruling is incomprehensible. We have to have an honest discussion with the U.S. if they are moving away from a rules-based trading system, and if and how we can rescue the existing system."
 December 21: WTO ruled that the US was in breach of global trading rules for having claimed that products imported from Hong Kong, can be marked as coming from China. Hong Kong's government welcomed the ruling and its secretary for commerce and economic development, Algernon Yau, stated that "the revised origin marking requirement is politically motivated" and "a vain attempt to interfere with Hong Kong's internal affairs through weaponising trade". The US rejected the ruling and expressed that they had no intentions in abiding. The United States Trade Representative spokesperson Adam Hodge stated the US responded to "highly concerning actions" by China to erode Hong Kong's autonomy and the democratic and human rights of its people, and so qualified to be a threat to the national security of the US. However the WTO panel had disagreed that tensions between United States and Hong Kong, have increased to being an "emergency in international relations" which is the threshold required to qualify for an exception.

2023 

 January 27: European Commissioner for Internal Market Thierry Breton announced that the European Union will join the United States in blocking the sale of technology to China that would allow it to produce advanced semiconductor chips.
 
 February 17: China expands Unreliable Entities List to include Raytheon and Lockheed Martin.

Effects 

A November 2019 United Nations analysis reported that "the U.S. tariffs on China are economically hurting both countries". In the United States, it has led to higher costs for manufacturers, higher prices for consumers and financial difficulties for farmers. In China, the trade war contributed to a slowdown in the rate of economic and industrial output growth, which had already been declining. Many American companies have shifted supply chains to elsewhere in Asia, bringing fears that the trade war would lead to a US-China economic 'decoupling'. The trade war has also caused economic damage in other countries, though some  benefited from increased manufacturing as production was shifted to them. It also led to stock market instability. Governments around the world have taken steps to address some of the damage caused by the economic conflict.

By late 2019, the United States had imposed approximately US$350 billion in tariffs on Chinese imports, while China had imposed approximately US$100 billion on US exports.

China 
In April 2018, China announced that it would eliminate laws that required global automakers and shipbuilders to work through state-owned partners. President of China and General Secretary Xi Jinping reiterated those pledges, affirming a desire to increase imports, lower foreign-ownership limits on manufacturing and expand protection to intellectual property, all central issues in Trump's complaints about their trade imbalance. Trump thanked Xi for his "kind words on tariffs and automobile barriers" and "his enlightenment" on intellectual property and technology transfers. "We will make great progress together!" the president added.

Income tax deductions were also allowed for family care, medical and educational expenses, as well as for mortgage interest. The tax cuts were worth around  trillion (US$324 billion).

In May 2019, China's industrial output growth fell to 5.0%, which was the lowest rate in 17 years. Exports fell by 1.3% in June compared to the previous year; imports declined 8.5% in May and 7.3% in June. According to an analysis by Peterson Institute for International Economics published in June 2019, China had lowered tariffs on imports from countries other than the U.S. from an average of 8.0% to 6.7%, while average tariffs on U.S. imports rose from 8.0% to 20.7%.

In December 2019, the South China Morning Post reported that, due to the trade war and the Chinese government's crackdown on shadow banking, Chinese manufacturing investments were expanding at the lowest rate since records began. Economic growth rate for 2019 was 6.1%, the slowest since 1990.

The trade war contributed to a rise in Chinese nationalism; the South China Morning Post reported that the conflict helped the Communist Party "shore up much-needed domestic support". The external pressure of the trade war allowed Chinese leader Xi Jinping to point to the United States' actions as a reason for China's economic slowdown. The Chinese public responded. Academic Suisheng Zhao summarizes, "Proud of their accomplishments through hard work, tremendous sacrifices, dogged determination, and well-crafted policies, Many Chinese are fed up with US criticisms that China's rise is because it did not play by rules, violated international commitments, and tilted the playing field to advantage Chinese firms."

United States 
By early July 2018, there were negative and positive results already showing up in the American economy as a result of the tariffs, as a number of industries showed employment growth while others were planning on layoffs. American commentators noted that consumer products were the most likely to be affected by the tariffs. A timeline of when costs would rise was uncertain as companies had to figure out if they could sustain a tariff hike without passing on the costs to consumers.

American farmers were particularly severely affected by China's retaliatory trade actions. In response, the Trump administration's aid relief for the difficulties faced by the farmers came in the form of cash payments, securing additional trade deals and modifying environmental regulations to benefit corn farmers. According to the American Farm Bureau, agricultural exports from the US to China decreased from $24 billion in 2014 to $9.1 billion in 2018, including decreases in sales of pork, soybeans, and wheat. Farm bankruptcies have increased, and agricultural equipment manufacturer Deere & Company cut its profit forecast twice between January and August 2019. An August 2019 USDA report showed that as American wheat exports to China dropped, Canadian wheat exports to China rose from 32% to more than 60%. Farm equipment manufacturers were negatively affected by the reluctance of farmers to invest in new equipment, with sales dropping significantly during the first quarter of 2019. Yet despite the negative effects, polls in July 2019 showed that most farmers continued to support Trump, as 78% of them said they believed the trade war will ultimately benefit U.S. agriculture. The Government Accountability Office announced in February 2020 that it would examine the program, amid reports that aid was being improperly distributed.

According to a study by the National Retail Federation of the United States, a 25% tariff on Chinese furniture alone would cost US consumers an additional $4.6 billion in annual payments.

Analysis conducted by the Peterson Institute for International Economics found that China imposed uniform tariffs averaging 8% on all its importers in January 2018, before the trade war began. By June 2019, tariffs on American imports had increased to 20.7%, while tariffs on other nations declined to 6.7%. The analysis also found that average American tariffs on Chinese goods increased from 3.1% in 2017 to 24.3% by August 2019.

Analysis by Goldman Sachs in May 2019 found that the consumer price index for nine categories of tariffed goods had increased dramatically, compared to a declining CPI for all other core goods.

In an August 2019 interview with CNN's Jake Tapper, Navarro claimed that tariffs were not hurting Americans, despite evidence to the contrary.

Surveys of consumer sentiment and small business confidence showed sharp declines in August 2019 on uncertainty caused by the trade war. The closely followed Purchasing Managers' Index for manufacturing from the Institute for Supply Management showed contraction in August, for the first time since January 2016; the ISM quoted several executives expressing anxiety about the continuing trade war, citing shrinking export orders and the challenges of shifting their supply chains out of China. The IHS Markit manufacturing purchasing managers' index also showed contraction in August, for the first time since September 2009. The day the ISM report was released, Trump tweeted, "China's Supply Chain will crumble and businesses, jobs and money will be gone!"

Analysis conducted by Moody's Analytics estimated that through August 2019 300,000 American jobs had either been lost or not created due to the trade war, especially affecting manufacturing, warehousing, distribution and retail.

By September 2019, American manufacturers were reducing their capital investments and delaying hiring due to uncertainty caused by the trade war.

American importers were allowed to apply for exclusions from the tariffs. The Wall Street Journal reported in February 2020 that the USTR was granting fewer tariff waivers to American firms, down from 35% of requests for the first two tranches of tariffs in 2018 to 3% for the third tranche in 2019. The mechanism for applying for exclusions expired in 2020.

Overall economy
Analysis published by The Wall Street Journal in October 2020 found the trade war did not achieve the primary objective of reviving American manufacturing nor did it result in the reshoring of factory production. Though the trade war led to higher employment in certain industries, tariffs led to a net loss of U.S. manufacturing jobs. The trade war reduced the United States' trade deficit with China in 2019, but this trend reversed itself in 2020 with the trade deficit increasing back to its pre–trade war level, while the United States' overall trade deficit has increased.

Despite the United States trade deficit with China declining sharply from the record high in 2018, during the Trump presidency the overall deficit increased to the highest level since 2008 as American businesses shifted their imports to other countries to avoid the Trump tariffs. The deficit in goods increased 21% from 2016 to a record high. American exports — notably farm goods — were also weakened by retaliatory actions from China, the European Union, and other countries.

Analysis published by Chad Bown of the Peterson Institute for International Economics found that if there was no trade war initiated by Trump and if the US share of the Chinese market had just stayed consistent, then US exports to China would have been $119 billion bigger than what was actually recorded during Trump's administration during 2018 to 2021. Additionally, the trade war had incurred further costs of $30 billion in taxpayers funds that Trump used to subsidise the country's farmers to compensate for their lost sales to China from 2018 to 2020. Bown concluded that Trump's trade policies were not worth it for US exporters and that they would had likely have been better off without Trump's trade war.

Stock market
Investor uncertainty due to the trade war has caused turbulence in the stock market.

The Dow Jones Industrial Average fell 724 points, or 2.9%, after the tariffs were announced due to concerns over a trade war. Corporations that traded with China, such as Caterpillar Inc. and Boeing, suffered large losses in their stock price.

On December 4, 2018, the Dow Jones Industrial Average logged its worst day in nearly a month as it declined nearly 600 points, to which some argue is in part due to the trade war. On December 26, the Dow Jones recorded a rise of 1000 points after, according to Reuters, the publication of a report that documented strong holiday sales, although the major indexes were still down more than 10% through the month of December 2018 amid the trade war.

On August 14, 2019, the Dow dropped 800 points, partly caused by increasing trade tensions between the U.S. and China. Nine days later, on August 23, the Dow dropped 623 points on the day that Trump informally ordered American companies to immediately seek alternatives to doing business in China. By the end of 2019, stock markets reached record highs, having risen due to the agreement between the United States and China to sign the first phase of a trade deal.

Elections

Analysts speculated that the trade war could affect the 2020 United States presidential election, as tariffs have negatively affected farmers, an important constituency for Trump. Analysts also speculated on how the trade war affected Xi Jinping in relation to the domestic pressures that he faced.

In 2021, following the transition to the Biden administration, the Financial Times reported that "rushing to remove the tariffs could prove risky" for the Democrats in the 2022 United States elections.

Other countries

Economic growth has slowed worldwide amid the trade war. The International Monetary Fund's World Economic Outlook report released in April 2019 lowered the global economic growth forecast for 2019 from 3.6% expected in 2018 to 3.3%, and said that economic and trade frictions may further curb global economic growth and continue weaken the investment. According to Capital Economics, China's economic growth has slowed as a result of the trade war, though overall the Chinese economy "has held up well", and China's share of global exports has increased. U.S. economic growth has also slowed.

Globally, foreign direct investment has slowed. The trade war has hurt the European economy, particularly Germany, even though trade relations between Germany and China and between Germany and the U.S. remain good. Germany and the EU have had high levels of trade with China, and the German government and public want to maintain these trade ties. The Canadian economy has seen negative effects as well. Like the U.S., Britain, Germany, Japan, and South Korea were all showing "a weak manufacturing performance" as of 2019. Several Asian governments have instituted stimulus measures to address damage from the trade war, though economists said this may not be effective.

A trade group predicted that demand for semiconductor devices would decline by 12 per cent, as a direct result of the trade war.

Some countries have benefited economically from the trade war, at least in some sectors, due to increasing exports to the United States and China to fill the gaps left by decreasing trade between these two economies. Beneficiaries include Vietnam, Chile, India, Malaysia, and Argentina. Vietnam is the biggest beneficiary, with technology companies moving manufacturing there. South Korea has also benefited from increased electronics exports, Malaysia from semiconductor exports, Mexico from motor vehicles, and Brazil from soybeans. Trade diversion effects have also had an impact on countries in East and Southeast Asia with Taiwan getting the largest boost. US-ASEAN Business Council CEO Alex Feldman said these countries may not benefit for long: "It's in everyone's interest to see this spat get resolved and go back to normal trade relations between the US and China." Several Taiwanese companies have been expanding production domestically, including Quanta Computer, Sercomm and Wistron, creating over 21,000 jobs. This investment led to a significant strengthening of the New Taiwan Dollar which had not been expected pre-Trade War. Nintendo has reportedly moved some Nintendo Switch production from China to Southeast Asia.

The trade war has indirectly caused some companies to go bankrupt. One of them, Taiwanese LCD panel manufacturer Chunghwa Picture Tubes (CPT), went bankrupt as a result of an excess supply of panels and a subsequent collapse in prices, which was aided by vulnerability to the trade war, a slowing Taiwanese and global economy and a slowdown in the electronics sector.

Reactions

In China
Mainland Chinese politicians and economists have been divided over the trade war. An August 2019 article in NPR said that while some in the PRC leadership argued for a quick resolution to the trade war in order to save China's economy, others said that the country should push back against the United States and avoid an agreement at all costs.

In July 2018, academic Xu Zhangrun said that the trade war revealed underlying weaknesses in the Chinese political system and criticized Chinese leader Xi Jinping for his "overweening pride" and "vanity politics."

In August 2018, Hong Kong-based academic Willy Lam said that the trade war had galvanized all the previous misgivings which different countries in the West had toward China and undermined Chinese leader Xi Jinping's authority. Zhang Baohui, a political science professor at Lingnan University in Hong Kong, similarly said that the trade war had been effective in challenging the myth of Chinese invincibility, saying that the tariffs "really hurt China at a very bad time, when the economy is experiencing serious trouble."

Economist Sheng Hong, director of the defunct think tank Unirule Institute of Economics, said that it would be good if China yielded to America's request for fair trade, arguing that the "China model" of state capitalism was incompatible with its policies of market reforms and damaging China's economy. Amidst the closure Unirule after Hong was accused of threatening of state security, Hong likened Beijing's inability to brook internal criticism to "riding in a car with a filthy windshield."

A December 2018 journal article published by two Chinese academics said that in the worst-case scenario of the trade war, China would suffer a 1.1% decrease in employment and a 1% GDP loss, which they said were not negligible, but manageable for China. Another paper published in February 2018 by Chinese academics similarly concluded that whereas the United States would experience large social welfare losses as a result of the trade war, China may lose or gain slightly depending on the effect of trade war on the U.S.–China trade balance.

In September 2019, Lu Xiang, an analyst at the state-backed Chinese Academy of Social Sciences, expressed pessimism about the outcome of upcoming talks, called Trump "unpredictable", and said, "We can only try to find sensible clues in his nonsense."

Domestic reporting on the trade war is censored in China. While news outlets are permitted to report on the conflict, their coverage is subject to restrictions; the South China Morning Post said that employees for Chinese media were told not to "over-report" the trade war while an article in The New York Times said that state news outlets had sought to promote the official line, with the authorities restricting the use of the phrase "trade war." Social media posts about the conflict are subject to censorship as well.

The trade war is a common subject on Chinese social media, with one popular Internet meme referencing Thanos, a villain from Marvel Comics and the Marvel Cinematic Universe who wipes out half of all life in the universe using the Infinity Gauntlet, joking that Trump will similarly wipe out half of China's investors.

Hong Kong economics professor Lawrence J. Lau argues that a major cause of the trade war is the growing battle between China and the U.S. for global economic and technological dominance. He argues, "It is also a reflection of the rise of populism, isolationism, nationalism and protectionism almost everywhere in the world, including in the US."

In mid-2021, Taoran Notes, a social media account associated with the state-run Economic Daily, advised Chinese decision-makers to remain calm and recommended that both sides develop a deeper understanding of each other's perspectives. Taoran Notes said that the two countries had chosen "the path of cooperation that seeks common ground while reserving differences".

People's Daily, the official newspaper of the Central Committee of the Chinese Communist Party, has stated that China will be able to withstand the trade war, and that Trump's policies are affecting American consumers.

In the United States

Congress
Some Democrats opposed the trade war for putting a burden on American consumers and causing inflation, while other Democrats thought action against China was necessary, although not all such Democrats thought the trade war initiated by Trump was the right means of action.

Senate Democratic leader Chuck Schumer praised President Trump's higher tariffs against China's alleged taking advantage of the U.S. and said "Democrats, Republicans, Americans of every political ideology, every region in the country should support these actions." Other Democratic senators who supported Trump's actions include Bob Menendez, Sherrod Brown and Ron Wyden Bipartisan support from the House of Representatives for Trump's actions came from Nancy Pelosi. Brad Sherman, Kevin Brady, and Ted Yoho. Democratic representative Tim Ryan, said, "What China has been doing is bullshit. They're cheating, they're subsidizing their product." Senator Marco Rubio has also supported the tariffs, which he referred to as a "theft tax".

Other Republican senators have given more divided statements. Mitch McConnell said that "nobody wins a trade war" but that there was hope the tactics would "get us into a better position, vis-à-vis China." John Cornyn said, "If this is what it takes to get a good deal, I think people will hang in there, but at some point we've got to get it resolved. If this goes on for a long time, everybody realizes it's playing with a live hand grenade." Joni Ernst said in May 2019 that the "tariffs are hurtful" to farmers, but that they "do want us to find a path forward with China" and said, "We hope that we can get a deal soon".

Other senators from both parties have criticized Trump for the trade war, including Charles E. Grassley, Tim Kaine, Mark Warner, Elizabeth Warren, and Ron Wyden.

Agricultural
The Associated Press reported in 2018 that "Dave Warner, a spokesman for the National Pork Producers Council, said pork producers have already seen the value of their pigs fall after a previous Chinese tariff. Warner said pig producers will likely feel the effect of the new tariff, though it's not yet clear exactly how."

Iowa soybean farmer and president of the American Soybean Association John Heisdorffer called the use of tariffs a "scorched-earth approach", warning that U.S. industries could permanently lose global market share as a result.

The mayors of Davenport and St. Gabriel, which represented towns with a heavy reliance on the farming sector, expressed their concerns of impacts that the trade war would have on their cities.

In August 2019, Roger Johnson of the National Farmers Union—representing about 200,000 family farmers, ranchers and fishers—stated that the trade war was creating problems for American farmers, specifically highlighting the fall in soybean exports from the U.S. to China. In the same month, the American Farm Bureau Federation—representing large agribusiness—said that the announcement of new tariffs "signals more trouble for American agriculture."

Business
More than 3,500 American businesses sued the Trump administration over the tariffs.

In September 2018, a business coalition announced a lobbying campaign called "Tariffs Hurt the Heartland" to protest the proposed tariffs; the tariffs on Chinese steel, aluminium, and certain chemicals contributed to rising fertilizer and agricultural equipment costs in the United States.

In February 2019, a survey released by the American Chamber of Commerce in China showed that a majority of member U.S. companies supported increasing or maintaining tariffs on Chinese goods, and nearly twice as many respondents compared to the year before wanted the U.S. government to push Beijing harder to create a level playing field. A further 19 percent of its companies said they were adjusting supply chains or seeking to source components and assembly outside of China as a result of tariffs and 28% were delaying or cancelling investment decisions in China.

Over 600 companies and trade associations, including manufacturers, retailers, and tech companies, wrote to Trump in mid-2019 to ask him to remove tariffs and end the trade war, saying that increased tariffs would have "a significant, negative, and long-term impact on American businesses, farmers, families, and the US economy".

On May 20, 2019, the Footwear Distributors and Retailers of America, an industry trade association for footwear, issued an open letter to President Trump, part of which read: "On behalf of our hundreds of millions of footwear consumers and hundreds of thousands of employees, we ask that you immediately stop this action", referring to the trade war.

Americans for Free Trade, a coalition of over 160 business organizations, wrote a letter to Trump in August 2019 requesting that he postpone all tariff rate increases on Chinese goods, citing concerns about cost increases for U.S. manufacturers and farmers. The coalition includes the National Retail Federation, the Consumer Technology Association, Association of Equipment Manufacturers, the Toy Association and American Petroleum Institute, among others.

In September 2019, Matthew Shay, president and CEO of the National Retail Federation, said that the trade war had "gone on far too long" and had harmful effects on American businesses and consumers. He urged the Trump administration to end the trade war and find an agreement to remove all the tariffs.

Hun Quach, vice president of international trade for the Retail Industry Leaders Association has claimed that the tariffs will impact American family budgets by raising the prices of everyday items.

A spokesperson for the US–China Business Council said that the tariffs were "deeply unpopular with American consumers and businesses who bear the cost".

Manufacturing
The CEOs of American steelmakers Nucor Corp, United States Steel Corp, ArcelorMittal SA and Commercial Metals Co have all supported Trump's steel tariffs against China as has the United Steelworkers Union. Scott Paul, president of the associated Alliance for American Manufacturing, has also supported tariffs, and opposed proposals to reverse them in light of the coronavirus pandemic. In 2019, he criticized the stagnation of trade talks saying "Trump would have ripped any Democrat for that outcome".

James Hoffa Jr., president of the International Brotherhood of Teamsters, has been a proponent of U.S. tariffs against China as has Richard Trumka, president of AFL–CIO.

A 2019 statement by the National Association of Manufacturers stated their opposition to the trade war, calling for a new structure for the U.S.–China commercial relationship that would eliminate China's unfair trade practices and level the playing field for manufacturers in the United States. A 2018 Politico article documented the close partnership between the president of NAM Jay Timmons and President Trump and said that Timmons was fighting against Trump's trade war from within.

The vice president of the National Marine Manufacturers Association criticized the tariffs, saying they were "hurting American manufacturers."

Economists and analysts
According to articles in PolitiFact, most mainstream economists said that "consumers are the primary victims of tariffs" and most economists said that they carry "more risks than benefits". Nearly all economists who responded to surveys  conducted by the Associated Press and Reuters said that Trump's tariffs would do more harm than good to the economy of the United States, and some economists advocated for alternate means for the United States to address its trade deficit with China.

NYU Economics Professor Lawrence J. White has said that import tariffs are equivalent to a tax, and contribute to a higher cost of living.

Economic analyst Zachary Karabell has argued that the administration's tariff-based approach would not work as it would not "reverse what has already been transferred and will not do much to address the challenge of China today, which is no longer a manufacturing neophyte" and also argued that the assertion that more rigorous intellectual property protections would "level the playing field" was problematic. He recommended instead that the U.S. focus on its relative advantages of economic openness and a culture of independence.

James Andrew Lewis of the Center for Strategic and International Studies said that what the United States needed from China was a commitment to observe the rules and norms of international trade and to extend reciprocal treatment to U.S. companies in China.

In an April 2018 article in Forbes, Harry G. Broadman, a former U.S. trade negotiator, said that while he agreed with the Trump administration's basic position that the Chinese did not abide by fair, transparent and market-based rules for global trade, he disagreed with its means of unilaterally employing tariffs and said that the administration should instead pursue a coalition-based approach.

In a November 2018 testimony before the Senate Finance Committee, Jennifer Hillman, a professor of practice at Georgetown University Law School, said that United States "ought to be bringing a big and bold case, based on a coalition of countries working together to take on China."

Chad Bown, a senior fellow at the Peterson Institute for International Economics said that while it made sense for other countries to get more involved in confronting China, the problem was that they didn't know how serious Trump was on reforming the larger, systemic issues.

Michael Wessel described plans to allow foreign companies a greater role in the Chinese technology program "an influence operation at its best" and also questioned whether changes in relevant Chinese laws would mean much so long as the courts remained under the control of the Chinese Communist Party.

A May 2019 article written by Howard Gleckman of the Tax Policy Center argued that the impact of the trade war would eliminate "most or all" of the benefits from the Tax Cuts and Jobs Act for low- and middle-income households.

Economists at financial firm Morgan Stanley expressed uncertainty about how the trade war would end, but warned in June 2019 that it could lead to a recession.

Economist Panos Mourdoukoutas states that China's elites were fighting the trade war under the wrong assumption that China had reached "power parity" with the U.S. and that although an economic divorce between the two countries would have some consequences for the US, it would on the other hand be devastating for China.

In November 2019, Jim Cramer said that unless China purchased a considerable amount of American goods as a way to prove the validity of the arguments proffered by the free-trade contingent in the Trump administration, the U.S.-China trade war would continue on for a significant period of time.

After the first phase of a trade deal was agreed upon in December 2019, Mary E. Lovely of the Peterson Institute for International Economics and professor at Syracuse University said the ceasefire was "good news" for the American economy while expressing optimism that the talks would help address China's "unfair" intellectual property practices.

Economist Paul Krugman said in September 2020 that if Democratic candidate Joe Biden won the U.S. presidential election, he should maintain a tough stance against China, but focus more on industrial policy than trade tariffs.

Economist C. Fred Bergsten concluded in 2021 that "China's economy is too large and too powerful to be suppressed. It fended off the Trump attacks with little damage, and indeed with renewed confidence in its prospects."

Others
Minxin Pei, a scholar of Chinese politics at California's Claremont McKenna College, argued that Mr. Xi's ambition for China's revival as a worldpower had been revealed as hollow through the continuing trade dispute.

The former Vice President Joe Biden said: "While Trump is pursuing a damaging and erratic trade war, without any real strategy, China is positioning itself to lead the world in renewable energy."

An August 2019 Harvard CAPS/Harris Poll found that 67% of registered voters wanted the U.S. to confront Beijing over its trade policies despite the fact that 74% said American consumers were shouldering most of the burden of tariffs. Mark Penn, the co-director of the Harvard CAPS/Harris Poll, said the poll showed strong support amongst the American public for Trump's trade policies against China, saying, "They realize that the tariffs may have negative impacts on jobs and prices, but they believe the fight here is the right one."

Tariffs on medical supplies have become politically complicated due to the COVID-19 pandemic. The Wall Street Journal, citing Trade Data Monitor to show that China is the leading source of many key medical supplies, raised concerns that US tariffs on imports from China threaten imports of medical supplies into the United States.

International

A September 2018 article by Brahma Chellaney said that America's  trade war with China should not obscure a broader pushback against China's mercantilist trade, investment, and lending practices.

At the 2018 G20 summit, the trade war was on the agenda for discussion.

In December 2018  Jorge Guajardo, former Mexican ambassador to China, said in an article in The Washington Post that "One thing the Chinese have had to acknowledge is that it wasn't a Trump issue; it was a world issue. Everybody's tired of the way China games the trading system and makes promises that never amount to anything."

A March 2019 Reuters article said that the European Union shared many of the Trump administration's same complaints with regards to China's technology transfer policies and market access constraints and also reported that European diplomats and officials acknowledged support for Trump's goals, even if they disagreed with his tactics.

Singaporean Prime Minister Lee Hsien Loong said that the trade war was negatively affecting Singapore and described it as "very worrying". He urged both the U.S. and Chinese governments to change their approaches.

At the 45th G7 summit, UK Prime Minister Boris Johnson said, "We don't like tariffs on the whole."  An article in ABC said that U.S. allies warned Trump during the summit about his trade war with China, but that Trump said he wasn't facing any pressure from his allies over the trade war. European Council President Donald Tusk said the trade war risked causing a global recession.

The Chilean vice minister for trade, Rodrigo Yanez, told CNBC that "It's very important for Chile that a trade deal between the U.S. and China is signed soon".

In the wake of the 2020 Galwan Valley skirmish, Indian commentators made references to the US-China trade war as part of their overall analysis of the effect that the skirmish would have on the future relations between India and China.

See also 

Anti-American sentiment in China
Anti-Chinese sentiment in the United States
Chinese espionage in the United States
CIA activities in China
Congressional-Executive Commission on China 
Japan–South Korea trade dispute
Protectionism in the United States
Rare earths trade dispute
Second Cold War
Trump tariffs
2002 United States steel tariff

References

Further reading 

 Albuquerque, José Luiz, Antonio MArcelo Jackson Ferreira da Silva, and José Medeiros da Silva. "The China–US Trade War." Revista do Fórum Internacional de Ideias 9.1 (2019): 11+ online, a Brazilian perspective
 Boucher, Jean-Christophe, and Cameron G. Thies. "'I Am a Tariff Man': The Power of Populist Foreign Policy Rhetoric under President Trump." Journal of Politics 81.2 (2019): 712–722.
Chong, Terence Tai Leung, and Xiaoyang Li. "Understanding the China–US trade war: causes, economic impact, and the worst-case scenario." Economic and Political Studies 7.2 (2019): 185–202. online, a historical perspective
 Crowley,  Meredith A. (ed.),  Trade War: The Clash of Economic Systems Endangering Global Prosperity (CEPR Press, 2019).
 Fenby,  Jonathan, and Trey McArver. The Eagle and the Dragon: Donald Trump, Xi Jinping and the Fate of US/China Relations (2019)
 Foot, Rosemary, and Amy King. "Assessing the deterioration in China–US relations: US governmental perspectives on the economic-security nexus." China International Strategy Review (2019): 1–12. online
 Lau, Lawrence J. The China–U.S. Trade War and Future Economic Relations (Hong Kong: The Chinese University of Hong Kong Press, 2019)  online, a Hong Kong perspective
 Qiu, Larry D., Chaoqun Zhan, and Xing Wei. "An analysis of the China–US trade war through the lens of the trade literature." Economic and Political Studies 7.2 (2019): 148–168.
 Qiu, Larry D., and Xing Wei. "China–US trade: implications on conflicts." China Economic Journal (2019): 1-20.

External links 

2018 in American politics
2018 in China
2018 in economics
2018 in international relations
Anti-American sentiment in China
Anti-Chinese sentiment in the United States
China–United States relations
China–United States economic relations
Economic history of the People's Republic of China
Economic history of the United States
Geopolitical rivalry
Presidency of Donald Trump
Trade wars
Trump administration controversies